A corrective colony (ИК/IK) is the most common type of prison in Russia and some other post-Soviet states. Such colonies combine penal detention with compulsory work. The system of labor colonies originated in 1929 alongside the Gulag labor camps, and after 1953 the corrective penal colonies in the Soviet Union developed as a post-Stalin replacement of the Gulag labor-camp system.

Soviet Union
In the late Soviet Union, the labor colonies were governed by Article 11 of the Corrective Labor Law and were intended for adult (16 years and over) convicts. The colonies were classified according to the regimen of severity: ordinary, reinforced, strict, and special regimens (колонии общего, усиленного, строгого, особого режимов), as well as the "colony-settlements" (колонии-поселения). Only ordinary and strict regimens (and colony-settlements) were provided for female convicts.

"Colony-settlements" were establishments introduced in 1960s for convicts with good behavior who served at least half of the term for those eligible for parole and who served two thirds of the term and not eligible for parole. The inmates live without guard but under observation and may move relatively freely and have family.

Russia

Of the four types of facilities of prisons in Russia, the corrective colony ( or IK) is the most common, with 760 institutions in 2004 across the many administrative divisions of Russia. In 2012, the Russian Federal Penitentiary Service reported that 585,000 prisoners were serving sentences at penal colonies, more than the 260,000 prisoners held in detention centers.

Corrective colony regimes are categorized as very strict/special, strict, general, and open. The detachment ( or ) is the basic unit of the prison. When not in the detachment, prisoners are required to participate in penal labor, which is in the form of work brigades in colony production zones where prisoners earn a wage of which most is paid to the colony for their upkeep.

The detachment is largely self-organized, with the prison administration designating the "head monitor" with the job of keeping order and to liaise with the prison administration, and is supported by various prisoners' committees responsible for health and safety, cleanliness, energy saving, and also psychological counselling. Female detachments organize cultural and social activities, including annual beauty pageants (called by such names as "Miss Colony" and "Miss Personality").

The conditions of prisons have been criticized by former prisoners and human rights activists.

References

Further reading

 

Penal labour
Penal system in the Soviet Union
Penal system in Russia
Unfree labor in the Soviet Union